Slider or Sliders may refer to:

Arts
 K.K. Slider, a fictional character within the Animal Crossing franchise
 The Slider, a 1972 album by T. Rex
 Sliders (TV series), an American science fiction and fantasy television series
 Slider, a recurring character in the animated television series Cyberchase

Sports
 Slider (cricket), a type of delivery bowled by a wrist spin bowler
 Slider (pitch), a breaking ball pitch in baseball
 Slider, mascot for the Major League Baseball team Cleveland Indians/Guardians

Technology
 Slider (BEAM), a robot that has a mode of locomotion by moving body parts smoothly along a surface
 Slider (computing), a graphical control element with which a user may set a value by moving an indicator
 Slider, a form factor of mobile phones
 Slider, a type of potentiometer

Other uses
 Lerista (also sliders), a diverse genus of skinks endemic to Australia
 Slide (footwear) (also sliders), a type of light footwear that are characterized by having a loose heel
 Slider (parachuting), a small rectangular piece of fabric with a grommet near each corner
 Slider (sandwich), American term for a small sandwich
 Slider, a crash damage protection accessory for motorcycles
 Sliders, Virginia, an unincorporated community in Buckingham County, in the U.S. state of Virginia
 SLIders, individuals who can allegedly induce the street light interference phenomenon
 Trachemys, a genus of turtles belonging to the family Emydidae

See also
 Slide (disambiguation)
 Sliding (disambiguation)